Malcolm Robert Buckby (born 8 September 1951) is a former politician who lost his seat in the electoral district of Light in the 2006 SA election. He is a former research economist and farmer first elected in 1993 replacing Bruce Eastick.

After the 2002 SA Election, Buckby was given the portfolios of Education, and transport, urban development, and planning portfolios in opposition.  In April 2004 Buckby gave up his portfolios to concentrate on his electorate. Tony Piccolo won this seat in the 2006 SA election with 52.1% on two-party preference, a swing of 4.9%.

References

External links
 Poll Bludger article

Members of the South Australian House of Assembly
Liberal Party of Australia members of the Parliament of South Australia
1951 births
Living people
21st-century Australian politicians